Dragon Crusaders is a 2011 film starring Dylan Jones, Cecily Fay and Feth Greenwood directed by Mark Atkins. It was dubbed in Tamil and was released on September 27, 2011.

Plot
A group of fugitive Knights Templar attacks a pirate ship and they are cursed to turn into hideous monsters. To fight the curse and ultimately save the world, they must defeat the Sorcerer (The Black Dragon) who is determined to destroy it.

Cast
 Dylan Jones as John the Brave
 Cecily Fay as Aerona
 Feth Greenwood as Eldred the Strong
 Shinead Byrne as Neem
 Tony Sams as Sigmund
 Simon Lloyd-Roberts as Maldwyn
 Charles Barrett as Harad
 Christian Howard as Calvain
 Steve McTigue as Faolon, The Black Dragon
 Gary Crosbie as Gerald
 Ambrose Flemming as Anthony

External links
 
 

2011 direct-to-video films
2011 films
2010s fantasy adventure films
American fantasy adventure films
Films about dragons
Films directed by Mark Atkins
Knights Templar in popular culture
The Asylum films
2010s English-language films
2010s American films